Harrison Spring is the largest spring in the U.S. state of Indiana. It is located in west-central Harrison County, near the Blue River and just north of White Cloud.

The Spring
Several dye trace studies have shown that the drainage basin of Harrison Spring is, by Indiana standards, very large. Indian Creek is a major infeeder to the Harrison Springs drainage system as the entire summer flow of Indian Creek can disappear at the Sinks of Indian Creek and re-emerge at Harrison Springs in low-flow conditions, in about one hour. Given that Big Indian Creek – upstream of the Sinks of Indian Creek – drains an area between Corydon and Georgetown, as well as Little Indian Creek (an infeeder to Big Indian) drains an area that runs east of Lanesville, the Indian Creek portion of the Harrison Spring drainage basin alone drains an area of at least .

While mapping parts of Binkley's Cave, the largest known cave in Indiana, the cavers of the Indiana Speleological Survey (ISS) have noted that according to their cave mapping data, water in the Blowing Hole section of Binkley's appears to flow under the bed of Indian Creek, near the Sinks of Indian Creek, and resurge at Harrison Spring. This is further proven by dye trace studies performed in the sinkhole plain containing Binkley's Cave.

Surface water that sinks into the sinkhole plain in areas near the intersection of Shiloh Road and Indiana State Road 135 south of Corydon has been observed to flow through known parts of Binkley's Cave, subterraneally under Indian Creek, exit to the surface at Harrison Spring, and flow to the Blue River. There may be a link under Indian Creek between Harrison Spring and Binkley's Cave. However the route would certainly involve many long cave dives – nothing of which on such a scale has ever been attempted in Indiana. Such a connection would likely greatly expand the known lengths of both caves as there are still significant gaps of unexplored cave in between the two systems. Cave divers led by Dave Strickland have mapped several thousand feet of cave in Harrison Spring – all of which was at a significant depth, and entirely underwater.

It is within an abandoned meander loop of Blue River. The water from the spring overflows into an outlet that travels about  before merging with Blue River as a tributary.

History

The spring is privately owned. It was once part of a large  farm owned by United States President William Henry Harrison, from whom it gains its name. The spring produced enough water to run a gristmill and sawmill downstream which began operating 1807, making it one of the first in the state. The farm was known as Harrison Valley. Harrison had planned to make it a plantation similar to Grouseland, and a shipyard. However, the outlawing of slavery by the Indiana Constitution of 1816 made this impossible.

The spring was registered as a National Natural Landmark in 1980, but is not open to the public.

References

 2007 NSS Convention Guidebook: Bassett 2007: pages 212–217

External links
 Harrison Spring: One of the Largest in the Midwest
 Harrison Springs

Springs of Indiana
Bodies of water of Harrison County, Indiana
National Natural Landmarks in Indiana